The Attack-class patrol boats were small coastal defence vessels built for the Royal Australian Navy (RAN) and operated between 1967 and at least 1991. Following their Australian service, twelve ships were transferred to Papua New Guinea and Indonesia.

Construction
Twenty boats were ordered by the Department of Defence in November 1965 at a cost of around A$800,000 each from two Queensland shipyards, Evans Deakin in Brisbane and Walkers in Maryborough. Five were marked for the formation of a "New Guinea coastal security force", while the other fifteen were for patrols and general duties in Australian waters.

The first vessel was scheduled to be commissioned in August 1966, but she was not launched until March 1967.

The inclusion of the Attack class in the RAN fleet led to a second version of the ship's badge design to be created, as it was not deemed appropriate for such small vessels to use the full-size badge.

Operational history and fates

The Attack class was replaced in RAN service by the larger and more capable s.

In 1975, Aitape, Ladava,  Lae, Madang, and Samarai were transferred to the Papua New Guinea Defence Force. All five were paid off during the late 1980s, with Aitape sunk as a dive wreck off Port Moresby in 1995.

Acute, Archer, Assail, Attack, Barbette, Bandolier, Barricade, and Bombard were transferred to the Indonesian Navy between 1974 and 1985, and are listed in Jane's Fighting Ships as still operational in 2011.

 was destroyed in Darwin on 25 December 1974 during Cyclone Tracy.

Advance was donated to the Australian National Maritime Museum in the late 1980s for preservation as a museum ship. Ardent was to be preserved as a memorial in Darwin, but was instead sold into civilian service in 2001 and converted into a pleasure craft. Aware was sold to a private owner during the 1990s, who modified her for use as a diving and salvage mothership, then was resold in to new owners in 2006. Bayonet was scuttled in Bass Strait in 1999 and has been successfully dived. Adroit paid off on 28 March 1992 and was sunk as a target by A-4 Skyhawk aircraft of the Royal New Zealand Air Force west of Rottnest Island on 8 August 1994. The remainder of the class were broken up for scrap.

In fiction
Two Attack-class boats represented the fictional HMAS Ambush in the first series of the Australian Broadcasting Corporation TV series Patrol Boat.

List of ships

The 1998 edition of Jane's Fighting Ships reports that two vessels of a similar design, pennant numbers 860 and 861 (KRI Waigeo), were being operated by the Indonesian Navy. It speculates that these were locally built copies of the class.

References

Citations

Sources

 
 
 
 
 

 
Patrol boat classes